Benjamin Hunt is an English professional footballer who plays as a striker. 
He was a youth player at West Ham United, and made regular appearances in their reserve side, but never made the progression into their first team. At the end of the 2007–08 season he was released by the Hammers and he signed for Bristol Rovers.

Hunt's debut in senior football came on 16 August 2008 for Bristol Rovers in a League One match against Brighton & Hove Albion, when he came on as a 72nd-minute substitute for Darryl Duffy.

Ben Hunt agreed a one-month loan deal with Conference North side Gloucester City on 17 December 2009. He scored on his debut against Redditch United on Boxing Day. In March 2009 he joined Conference South champions Newport County on loan.

Along with 14 other players, he was released by Rovers at the end of the 2009–10 season. He signed for Dover Athletic on 20 July 2010. On 19 February 2011 he signed for Lewes in the Conference South.

Hunt then played for Conference South side Weston-super-Mare, after joining in August 2011. In October 2011, Hunt left Weston-super-Mare and signed for Gloucester City.

He joined Bishop's Stortford in March 2012. He first appeared for Cray Wanderers in the 2014–15 season, playing seven games. He returned 12 months later and scored on his first two appearances.

References

External links

1990 births
Living people
Footballers from Southwark
English footballers
Association football forwards
West Ham United F.C. players
Bristol Rovers F.C. players
Gloucester City A.F.C. players
Newport County A.F.C. players
Dover Athletic F.C. players
Lewes F.C. players
Weston-super-Mare A.F.C. players
Bishop's Stortford F.C. players
Tilbury F.C. players
Cray Wanderers F.C. players
Cray Valley Paper Mills F.C. players
English Football League players
National League (English football) players
Isthmian League players